Republic with Ann Bezulyk is a weekly social-political talk show on 5 Kanal about people's lives. The main topics are society, culture, international relations, and politics. Usually there are two main points of view on the main theme of discussion presented by different social elites.

In January and February 2013, Bezulyk had a similar program on Inter TV before it was replaced by Shuster Live. As of February 2013, Inter TV and Bezulyk were looking for a new program for her.

References

External links
 Page of program "Republic with Ann Bezulyk" on site of 5 kanal
 Official page of program Republic with Ann Bezulyk on Facebook

Ukrainian television talk shows